Vladimír Bednář (born 1 October 1948) is a Czech ice hockey player. He competed in the men's tournament at the 1972 Winter Olympics.

References

External links
 

1948 births
Living people
Czech ice hockey defencemen
HC Dukla Jihlava players
HC Karlovy Vary players
HK Partizan players
HC Plzeň players
Stjernen Hockey players
Olympic ice hockey players of Czechoslovakia
Ice hockey players at the 1972 Winter Olympics
People from Beroun
Olympic bronze medalists for Czechoslovakia
Olympic medalists in ice hockey
Medalists at the 1972 Winter Olympics
Sportspeople from the Central Bohemian Region
Czechoslovak ice hockey defencemen
Czechoslovak expatriate sportspeople in Norway
Czechoslovak expatriate sportspeople in Yugoslavia
Expatriate ice hockey players in Norway
Expatriate ice hockey players in Yugoslavia
Czechoslovak expatriate ice hockey people